House of Blues is an American chain of live music concert halls and restaurants. It was founded by Isaac Tigrett, the co-founder of Hard Rock Cafe, and Dan Aykroyd, co-star of the 1980 film The Blues Brothers. The first location opened at Harvard Square in Cambridge, Massachusetts on November 26, 1992 (Thanksgiving Day). The chain has been a division of Live Nation Entertainment since July 2006, and there are 11 locations throughout the United States .

Overview
The first House of Blues opened on November 26, 1992, in the Harvard Square commercial district and retail area of Cambridge, Massachusetts, as a live music concert hall and restaurant. The company was originally financed by Dan Aykroyd, Aerosmith, Paul Shaffer, River Phoenix, Jim Belushi, and Harvard University, among others. This original location closed in 2003 as the company sought a larger Boston location. However, the hands-in-concrete driveway where members of the Blues Brothers and others left their mark, still remains.  Aykroyd remains associated with the brand and is present for most openings, attending and performing as one half of The Blues Brothers.

In 1993 House of Blues launched a 501(c)(3) non-profit called International House of Blues Foundation which provided arts programs, resources and musical instruments for youths. The Music Forward Foundation continues to provide services for youth and has generated more than $20 million of support for these programs over its 20+ year existence.  Also in 1993, the syndicated program The House of Blues Radio Hour launched in partnership with CBS Radio Hour. The show is hosted by Aykroyd, in character as Elwood Blues, and focuses on the history of blues music and the contemporary artists honoring the art form. Its final episode aired in July 2017.

In 1999, House of Blues acquired Universal Concerts from Seagram. On July 5, 2006, Live Nation acquired House of Blues Entertainment and created the Live Nation Club and Theater Division. As a division of Live Nation, the company currently operates 11 clubs throughout North America.

Locations

Current

Former

List of affiliated Live Nation venues
The following is a list of venues operated by Live Nation:

See also
Live From the House of Blues, A 1995 TBS television series made in conjunction with the chain
List of music venues

Gallery

Notes

References

External links

House of Blues official site
House of Blues Hits Lansdowne
House of Blues Studios - Recording studios in Nashville, Encino, and Memphis

Blues venues
Music venues in the United States
Music venues in Los Angeles
Sunset Boulevard (Los Angeles)
Restaurants established in 1992
The Blues Brothers
1992 establishments in Massachusetts
Music venues in Chicago
Dan Aykroyd